Friðriksson is an Icelandic patronymic surname, literally meaning "son of Friðrik". Notable people with the name include:

Bjarni Friðriksson (born 1956), Icelandic judoka
Elvar Már Friðriksson (born 1994), Icelandic basketball player
Friðrik Friðriksson (born 1964), Icelandic footballer
Friðrik Þór Friðriksson (born 1954), Icelandic film director
Kristinn Friðriksson, Icelandic basketball player and coach
Þorsteinn B. Friðriksson, Icelandic businessman

Icelandic-language surnames